Rufino Walter Gama (born 20 June 1998) is a Timorese professional footballer and top scorer of the national team, the current record scorer for the Timor-Leste national football team with 7 goals. He played for Karketu Dili FC since 2018. He came to Lalenok United in January 2020, to strengthen the Club in the AFC Cup 2020 Playoff match against PSM Makassar.

International career
Gama made his international debut as an 81st-minute substitute against Malaysia. He scored his first international goal for Timor Leste in the game against Chinese Taipei which ended with a 1–2 defeat.

In September 2018, he was selected for the two-legged 2018 AFF Suzuki Cup qualifying matches against Brunei. He started both games as Timor-Leste win to advance to the competition proper, win 3–2 on aggregate.

The following year, Gama was selected for the 23 squad man for  two-legged 2022 World Cup qualification in June. He started in both games and scored one goal in the second leg at home for a 1–5 loss over Malaysia.

Career statistics

International

International goals
Scores and results list East Timor's goal tally first.

Honours

Karketu Dili

 Liga Amadora: Runner-up 2018
 Taça 12 de Novembro: Quarter-finals 2018

Lalenok United

 Copa FFTL: 2020
 Taça 12 de Novembro: 2020

References

1998 births
Living people
East Timorese footballers
Timor-Leste international footballers
East Timorese expatriate footballers
Association football forwards
Footballers at the 2018 Asian Games
Competitors at the 2017 Southeast Asian Games
Asian Games competitors for East Timor
Competitors at the 2019 Southeast Asian Games
Southeast Asian Games competitors for East Timor